Communauté d'agglomération Le Grand Chalon is an intercommunal structure, centred on the city of Chalon-sur-Saône. It is located in the Saône-et-Loire department, in the Bourgogne-Franche-Comté region, eastern France. It was created in January 1994. Its seat is in Chalon-sur-Saône. Its area is 551.7 km2. Its population was 113,879 in 2017, of which 45,096 in Chalon-sur-Saône proper.

Composition
The communauté d'agglomération consists of the following 51 communes:

Allerey-sur-Saône
Aluze
Barizey
Bouzeron
Chalon-sur-Saône
Chamilly
Champforgeuil
La Charmée
Charrecey
Chassey-le-Camp
Châtenoy-en-Bresse
Châtenoy-le-Royal
Cheilly-lès-Maranges
Crissey
Demigny
Dennevy
Dracy-le-Fort
Épervans
Farges-lès-Chalon
Fontaines
Fragnes-la-Loyère
Gergy
Givry
Jambles
Lans
Lessard-le-National
Lux
Marnay
Mellecey
Mercurey
Oslon
Remigny
Rully
Saint-Bérain-sur-Dheune
Saint-Denis-de-Vaux
Saint-Désert
Saint-Gilles
Saint-Jean-de-Vaux
Saint-Léger-sur-Dheune
Saint-Loup-de-Varennes
Saint-Loup-Géanges
Saint-Marcel
Saint-Mard-de-Vaux
Saint-Martin-sous-Montaigu
Saint-Rémy
Saint-Sernin-du-Plain
Sampigny-lès-Maranges
Sassenay
Sevrey
Varennes-le-Grand
Virey-le-Grand

References

Chalon
Chalon